Ross Kenseth (born May 25, 1993) is an American stock car racing driver who currently competes part-time in the Blizzard Series. He is the son of 2003 NASCAR Winston Cup Series champion Matt Kenseth. He has competed part-time in the NASCAR Xfinity Series and Camping World Truck Series, ARCA Midwest Tour, CRA Super Series and ARCA Racing Series.

Early life
Born in Appleton, Wisconsin, Kenseth attended college at Clemson University. He is the first child and only son of Matt Kenseth. He has four younger half-sisters from his father’s marriage.

In late 2015, Kenseth announced his engagement to Amber Odom. After moving on from racing, Kenseth became an accountant, moved to Miramar Beach, Florida with Odom, and had a daughter with her.

Racing career

Kenseth raced primarily in his native Wisconsin and elsewhere in the Midwest early in his career. He began by racing for one season in a legends car before moved up into late models at Columbus 151 Speedway as a 14-year-old. He won the 2009 Big 8 Late Model Series championship by leading the entire final race at LaCrosse Fairgrounds Speedway's Oktoberfest 48 race. The series tours Wisconsin and northern Illinois. It was his fifth race win that season and seventh overall in the series. Kenseth qualified the second fastest for the Snowball Derby in December 2009. In 2011, Kenseth finished first in the Red, White and Blue State Championship at Wisconsin International Raceway. In 2012, Kenseth won the Winchester 400 at Winchester Speedway and the All American 400 at Nashville Fairgrounds Speedway.

Before the start of the 2013 racing season, Kyle Busch offered Kenseth a ride in the NASCAR Camping World Truck Series for that year, but no deal was reached. Kenseth made his debut in the ARCA Racing Series in August 2013, driving at Madison International Speedway in a car owned by Ken Schrader. Kenseth won the pole for the event, and finished sixth in the race.

Kenseth competed in the CRA Super Series in 2014, driving for Boyne Machine Racing; he took the year off from his studies at Clemson and moved to Michigan to be closer to the team. In September Kenseth announced that he would make his superspeedway debut in the ARCA season finale at Kansas Speedway in October.

On April 17, 2015, Joe Gibbs Racing announced that Kenseth would make his NASCAR Xfinity Series debut at Chicagoland Speedway on June 20. Rain forced the race to be postponed by one day; Kenseth qualified second-fastest, led the opening lap, and finished in sixth place in his first NASCAR-sanctioned event. On October 20, Kenseth joined Hattori Racing Enterprises for his Camping World Truck Series debut at Martinsville Speedway.

Kenseth got back behind the wheel in 2020, driving a Blizzard Series race at Five Flags Speedway.

Personal life
Kenseth ended his racing career in 2016 and became an accountant for a real estate firm in Miramar Beach, Florida.

Motorsports career results

NASCAR
(key) (Bold – Pole position awarded by qualifying time. Italics – Pole position earned by points standings or practice time. * – Most laps led.)

Xfinity Series

Camping World Truck Series

 Season still in progress
 Ineligible for series points

ARCA Racing Series
(key) (Bold – Pole position awarded by qualifying time. Italics – Pole position earned by points standings or practice time. * – Most laps led.)

References

External links

 

Living people
1993 births
Sportspeople from Appleton, Wisconsin
Racing drivers from Wisconsin
ARCA Midwest Tour drivers
Clemson University alumni
NASCAR drivers
Joe Gibbs Racing drivers